Group C of the men's football tournament at the 2020 Summer Olympics was played from 22 to 28 July 2021 in Rifu's Miyagi Stadium, Saitama's Saitama Stadium and Sapporo's Sapporo Dome. The group consisted of Argentina, Australia, Egypt and Spain. The top two teams, Spain and Egypt,  advanced to the knockout stage.

Teams

Standings

In the quarter-finals,
The winners of Group C, Spain, advanced to play the runners-up of Group D, Ivory Coast.
The runners-up of Group C, Egypt, advanced to play the winners of Group D, Brazil.

Matches

Egypt vs Spain

Argentina vs Australia

Egypt vs Argentina

Australia vs Spain

Australia vs Egypt

Spain vs Argentina

Discipline
Fair play points would have been used as a tiebreaker if the overall and head-to-head records of teams were tied. These were calculated based on yellow and red cards received in all group matches as follows:
first yellow card: minus 1 point;
indirect red card (second yellow card): minus 3 points;
direct red card: minus 4 points;
yellow card and direct red card: minus 5 points;

Only one of the above deductions is applied to a player in a single match.

References

External links
Men's Olympic Football Tournament Tokyo 2020, FIFA.com

Group C